Enzo Sacchi (January 6, 1926 – July 12, 1988) was a road bicycle and track cyclist from Italy, who won the gold medal in the men's 1,000 metre sprint scratch race at the 1952 Summer Olympics in Helsinki, Finland.

Sacchi was born in Florence, where he also died. He was a professional rider from 1952 to 1965.

References

External links
 
 
 
 

1926 births
1988 deaths
Cyclists from Florence
Italian male cyclists
Italian track cyclists
Cyclists at the 1952 Summer Olympics
Olympic cyclists of Italy
Olympic gold medalists for Italy
Olympic medalists in cycling
Medalists at the 1952 Summer Olympics